NPO Splav is one of the leading global developers and manufacturers of multiple rocket launcher systems (MLRS), and one of the key companies providing Russian arms for the global market in the segment. It is the only company in Russia which designs and develops multiple launch rocket systems (MLRS) and cartridges.

The company is part of the Techmash holding (Rostec).

History
NPO Splav was established in 1945.

During the Ukrainian crisis on December 22, 2015, the United States through EO 13662 explicitly lists NPO Splav on the US Department of Treasury's Office of Foreign Assets Control (OFAC) Sectoral Sanctions Identifications List (SSI) because of its links to Rostec and blocks any United States person or entity or person in the United States from conducting business with NPO Splav and other entities associated with Rostec.

In 2016, Splav joined with Motovilikha Plants.

Products
 BM-21 Grad
 BM-27 Uragan
 BM-30 Smerch
 
 Udav-1 anti-submarine system
 RPK-8
 Tornado MRL

References

External links
 Official website

Tecmash
Companies based in Tula Oblast
Technology companies established in 1945
Defence companies of the Soviet Union
1945 establishments in Russia